Mobilize is a brand resulting from the joint venture between Renault and Jiangling Motors Corporation Group, after its subsidiary, JMEV, was reorganized as a joint venture in July 2019, after Renault acquired a majority stake. The company produces Mobilize passenger cars for use in public transport throughout Europe, such as car-sharing or taxi. In October 2022, Mobliize announced Mobilize Fast Charge, its new EV fast-charging network, with plans for 200 chargers, primarily at Renault dealerships near major roadways, by mid-2024.

Models

Current
 Mobilize Limo (2022)

Future
 Mobilize Duo (2023)
 Mobilize Bento (2023)

Concepts
On October 10, 2022, Mobilize presented a set of concepts alongside the production version of the Duo and Bento models. The first is a three-wheeled, single-seater electric vehicle named the Solo, while the other is the Ileo mobile charging station.

The idea for the Mobilize Solo came from Renault's design studio in India, starting from a skateboard with an umbrella, although the final concept is more like a chair in a cover. Inside there is room for one person in a semi-sitting position with a joystick instead of a steering wheel.

 Mobilize EZ-1 (2021)
 Mobilize Hippo (2021)
 Mobilize Solo (2022)

References

External links 
 

Car manufacturers
Renault
Jiangling Motors Corporation Group